The Eve Arden Show is a 26-episode American sitcom which aired during the 1957–1958 season on CBS, alternately sponsored by Lever Brothers and Shulton, Inc. (Old Spice).

Overview
The show, starring Eve Arden, centers on Liza Hammond, a widowed mother of her twin daughters who works as writer and lecturer. It features actress Frances Bavier (the future Aunt Bee of The Andy Griffith Show) as Hammond's mother, Nora, who lives with the family. In eight of the 26 episodes, Allyn Joslyn portrays George Howell, Hammond's agent and potential love interest.

The series was produced for Arden's Westhaven Enterprises by Desilu. The show was filmed with three cameras in front of a live audience, although a laugh track was used for sweetening purposes. The show was based on author Emily Kimbrough's book It Gives Me Great Pleasure.

Eve Arden had enjoyed a very successful run on radio in the CBS program Our Miss Brooks from 1948 to 1957. When it premiered as a television series in the fall of 1952, it was very popular with audiences and ran for four years on CBS.  During its final season, the ratings fell and the show was canceled in the spring of 1956. In the fall of 1957, Desilu Studios, which had produced Our Miss Brooks, attempted to resurrect Arden's television career with The Eve Arden Show and CBS scheduled it for Tuesday nights. With this new program, Arden was not able to duplicate the success she had with Our Miss Brooks. Despite the fact that it followed The Phil Silvers Show (which during its first two years had been one of the top 30 programs on television), both sitcoms failed to beat its competition on ABC - Cheyenne (with Sugarfoot on alternate weeks) and The Life and Times Of Wyatt Earp. After the 1957–1958 season, The Phil Silvers Show was renewed for one more year but The Eve Arden Show ended its one-year run after its 26th episode. For the next several years, Arden continued to work on television as a guest star on several programs. Then, in 1967, Desi Arnaz brought her back to weekly television in an NBC sitcom co-starring singer-comedian Kaye Ballard called The Mothers-In-Law. The series was only moderately successful and lasted two years.

Cast
 Eve Arden as Liza Hammond
 Allyn Joslyn as George Howell
 Frances Bavier as Nora (six episodes)
 Gail Stone as Jenny Hammond (seven episodes)
 Karen Greene as Mary Hammond (seven episodes)
 Willard Waterman as Carl Foster (four episodes)

Guest stars include Philip Ahn, Mary Jane Croft, Bill Goodwin, Mary Beth Hughes, Kathryn Card and Danny Richards, Jr., as Liza's nephew, Melvin.

Episode list

DVD release
Four episodes of the series were released on Region 1 DVD on February 26, 2008 by Alpha Video.

External links
"The Eve Arden Show" Old Time Radio

Episode of The Eve Arden Show at the Internet Archive

References 

1957 American television series debuts
1958 American television series endings
1950s American sitcoms
Black-and-white American television shows
CBS original programming
English-language television shows
Television shows set in New York (state)
Television series by CBS Studios
Television series about widowhood
Television shows about writers
Television series based on books